Huapeng Road is a station on Line 13 of the Shanghai Metro, part of phase two of the line.  Located at Chengshan Road and Huapeng Road in the city's Pudong New Area, the station opened with the rest of phases two and three of Line 13 on 30 December 2018. During the planning stages, the station was known as Liuli.

References 

Railway stations in Shanghai
Shanghai Metro stations in Pudong
Railway stations in China opened in 2018
Line 13, Shanghai Metro